Salvia hispanica, commonly known as chia, is a species of flowering plant in the mint family, Lamiaceae, native to central and southern Mexico and Guatemala. It is considered a pseudocereal, cultivated for its edible, hydrophilic chia seed, grown and commonly used as food in several countries of western South America, western Mexico, and the southwestern United States.

Etymology
The word "chia" is derived from the Nahuatl word chian, meaning oily.

S. hispanica is one of two plants known as "chia", the other being Salvia columbariae, which is sometimes called "golden chia".

Description
Its flowers are purple or white and are produced in numerous clusters in a spike at the end of each stem. Chia is hardy from USDA Zones 9–12. Many plants cultivated as S.hispanica are in fact Salvia lavandulifolia.

They are mottle-colored, with brown, gray, black, and white. The seeds are hydrophilic, absorbing up to 12 times their weight in liquid when soaked. While soaking, the seeds develop a mucilaginous coating that gives chia-based beverages a distinctive gelatinous texture.

Chia is grown and consumed commercially in its native Mexico and Guatemala, as well as Bolivia, Ecuador, Colombia, Nicaragua, northwestern Argentina, parts of Australia, and the southwestern United States. New patented varieties of chia have been bred in Kentucky for cultivation in northern latitudes of the United States.

Seeds

Chia is grown commercially for its seed, a food rich in omega-3 fatty acids since the seeds yield 25–30% extractable oil, including α-linolenic acid. Typical composition of the fat of the oil is 55% ω-3, 18% ω-6, 6% ω-9, and 10% saturated fat.

Cultivation

Climate and growing cycle length
The length of the growing cycle for chia varies based on location and is influenced by elevation. For production sites located in different ecosystems in Bolivia, Ecuador and northwestern Argentina, growing cycles are between 100 and 150 days in duration. Accordingly, commercial production fields are located in the range of  altitude across a variety of ecosystems ranging from tropical coastal desert, to tropical rain forest, and inter-Andean dry valley.

S. hispanica is a short-day flowering plant, indicating its photoperiodic sensitivity and lack of photoperiodic variability in traditional cultivars, which has limited commercial use of chia seeds to tropical and subtropical latitudes until 2012. Now, traditional domesticated lines of Salvia species grow naturally or can be cultivated in temperate zones at higher latitudes in the United States. In Arizona and Kentucky, seed maturation of traditional chia cultivars is stopped by frost before or after flower set, preventing seed harvesting. Advances in plant breeding during 2012, however, led to development of new early-flowering chia genotypes proving to have higher yields in Kentucky.

Seed yield and composition
Seed yield varies depending on cultivars, mode of cultivation, and growing conditions by geographic region. Genotype has a larger effect on yield than on protein content, oil content, fatty acid composition, or phenolic compounds, whereas high temperature reduces oil content and degree of unsaturation, and raises protein content.

Soil, seedbed requirements, and sowing
The cultivation of S. hispanica requires light to medium clay or sandy soils. The plant prefers well-drained, moderately fertile soils, but can cope with acid soils and moderate drought. Sown chia seeds need moisture for seedling establishment, while the maturing chia plant does not tolerate wet soils during growth.

Traditional cultivation techniques of S. hispanica include soil preparation by disruption and loosening followed by seed broadcasting.

Fertilization and irrigation
S. hispanica can be cultivated under low fertilizer input, using  nitrogen or in some cases, no fertilizer is used.

Irrigation frequency in chia production fields may vary from none to eight irrigations per growing season, depending on climatic conditions and rainfall.

Genetic diversity and breeding
The wide range of wild and cultivated varieties of S. hispanica are based on seed size, shattering of seeds, and seed color. Seed weight and color have high heritability, with a single recessive gene responsible for white color.

Diseases and crop management
Currently, no major pests or diseases affect chia production. Essential oils in chia leaves have repellent properties against insects, making it suitable for organic cultivation. Virus infections, however, possibly transmitted by white flies, may occur. Weeds may present a problem in the early development of the chia crop until its canopy closes, but because chia is sensitive to most commonly used herbicides, mechanical weed control is preferred.

Decorative and novelty uses

During the 1980s in the United States, the first substantial wave of chia seed sales was tied to Chia Pets. These "pets" come in the form of clay figures that serve as a base for a sticky paste of chia seeds; the figures then are watered and the seeds sprout into a form suggesting a fur covering for the figure. About 500,000 Chia Pets a year are sold in the US as novelties or house plants.

References

External links
 

hispanica
Crops originating from Mexico
Edible nuts and seeds
Flora of Guatemala
Medicinal plants
Plants described in 1753
Taxa named by Carl Linnaeus
Pseudocereals
Crops originating from Pre-Columbian North America